True Love Story is a 2014 Indian animation short film written and directed by Gitanjali Rao. The silent film is a coming-of-age romance film set in streets of Mumbai, where a flower-seller falls in love with a bar dancer, that too in Bollywood-fantasy style.

In February 2014, the film won the Golden Conch Best Animation Film Award at the 2014 Mumbai International Film Festival (MIFF). At the 2014 Cannes Film Festival the film was one of 10 selected short films at Critics' Week.

References

External links
 

2010s animated short films
2014 films
Films set in Mumbai
Animated films without speech
Indian animated films
Indian coming-of-age drama films
Indian romantic drama films
Indian short films
2010s coming-of-age drama films
2014 romantic drama films